is a private women's college in Yokohama, Kanagawa, Japan. It is a part of Ferris Jogakuin (学校法人フェリス女学院).

The predecessor of the school was founded by American Presbyterian missionaries in 1870 with the assistance of James Curtis Hepburn, primarily to teach the English language and western cultural values to women. The male counterpart of the school later became Meiji Gakuin University. It was chartered as a junior college in 1950 and became a four-year college in 1965.

The school currently has two campus locations: the main Ryokuen campus in Izumi-ku, Yokohama and a subsidiary Yamate campus for 3rd and 4th year music students at Naka-ku, Yokohama. Composed mainly of the departments of Humanities, International Studies and Music, the school has a student population of 2,667 undergraduates and 78 graduates, with a teaching staff of 85 professors and lecturers.

History

Ferris Women's College was established in 1965. It originated from the Ferris Seminary, named by 1875 and established by Mary Kidder.

In 1988, Ryokuen campus was founded.

See also

 Ferris Girls' School

References

External links
 
  "創設の頃のフェリス女学院" (Archive). Ferris University.
 
 

Educational institutions established in 1965
1965 establishments in Japan
Christian universities and colleges in Japan
Private universities and colleges in Japan
Universities and colleges in Yokohama
Women's universities and colleges in Japan